Türel is a surname. Notable people with the surname include:

 Menderes Türel (born 1964), Turkish politician
 Metin Türel (1937–2018), Turkish football coach

See also
 Hurel
 Turle

Turkish-language surnames
de:Türel